Chandan K. Sen is an Indian-American scientist who is known for contributions to the fields of regenerative medicine and wound care. He is currently a Indiana University Distinguished Professor. At Indiana University, Sen is the director of the Indiana Center for Regenerative Medicine and Engineering (ICRME), J. Stanley Battersby Chair and Professor of Surgery and as the Associate Dean of Research. He is an Editor-in-Chief of the Antioxidants & Redox Signaling as well as the Advances in Wound Care. Sen is known for his co-invention of the tissue nanotransfection technology for in vivo tissue reprogramming. His work has included the study of the electroceutical management of infection, and tocotrienol form on natural vitamin E. Sen has an H-index of 108.

Education
Chandan Sen received his BS and MS from the Rajabazar Science College at Calcutta University where he received his Bachelor of Sciences (Honors in Physiology) in 1987 and his Masters of Science in Human Physiology in 1990. 
 
Sen then moved to Finland for further studies. In 1994, he received his PhD in Physiology from the School of Medicine at the University of Eastern Finland - Kuopio Campus. In January 1995, Sen went to the University of California Berkeley for his postdoctoral studies on redox signaling in the Molecular and Cell Biology department (1995-1996). In 1997, Sen received his first faculty position at the Lawrence Berkeley National Laboratory in Berkeley California.

Career and discoveries
In 2000, Sen joined The Ohio State University. Here, he was promoted to full professor with tenure in 2004. Later he was recognized with the John H & Mildred C Lumley endowed chair of Surgery. At Ohio State, Sen also served as the Associate Dean of Research. He was the founding Executive Director of the OSU Comprehensive Wound Center, and the founding Director of the OSU Center for Regenerative Medicine & Cell-Based Therapies While at Ohio State, his primary areas of research interest included tissue injury, repair, regeneration, and infection that he studied through his research in stroke, tissue reprogramming, and cutaneous wound healing. This research led to the pioneering of Tissue Nanotransfection (TNT) technology in regenerative medicine. This in vivo tissue reprogramming technology was published in Nature Nanotechnology. The technology won a 2018 Edison Awards for Innovation.  Sen’s work has also led to electroceutical management of tissue infection, which received the Frost & Sullivan award for new product innovation. In 2021, Sen was elected Fellow of the National Academy of Inventors.   

In 2018 Sen was called “one of the world’s leading experts in the nascent field of regenerative medicine” by the Indianapolis Business Journal after he joined Indiana University as the Director of Indiana Center for Regenerative Medicine and Engineering (ICRME), Executive Director of IU Health Comprehensive Wound Center, J. Stanley Battersby Chair and Professor of Surgery, Associate Vice President of Research, Associate Dean for Entrepreneurial Research. He brought a staff of 30 researchers and $10 million in research grants. Sen is also Professor of Biomedical Engineering by courtesy of the Weldon School of Biomedical Engineering at Purdue University. His research currently focuses on the use of nanotechnology in tissue regeneration.
 
During the 2020 pandemic, Sen’s work discovered that electrical field can inactive coronavirus and that such approach can be used to develop person protective equipment employing an electroceutical fabric.

Books
Skeletal Muscle Research: Cellular Physiology & Biochemistry (ed. with M. J. Kankaanpää) (1993)
Skeletal Muscle Research: Metabolism & Pathophysiology (ed. with L. Packer and O. Hänninen) (1994)
Exercise and Oxygen Toxicity (ed. with M. Atalay) (1994)
Oxidative Stress In Skeletal Muscles (ed. with Reznick, A et al) (1998)
Antioxidant and Redox Regulation of Genes (ed. with H. Sies and P. Baeuerle) (1999)
Handbook of Oxidants & Antioxidants in Exercise (ed. with L. Packer and O. Hänninen) (2000)
Methods in Enzymology: Redox Cell Biology & Genetics - Parts A and B (ed. with L. Packer) (2002)
Methods in Enzymology: Oxygen Sensing (ed. with G. L. Semenza) (2004)
Advances in Wound Care - Volume 1 (2010)
Advances in Wound Care - Volume 2 (2011)
Nutrition and Enhanced Sports Performances (ed. with Bagchi D. and Nair S.) (2013)
MicroRNA in Regenerative Medicine (2014)

References

Indiana University faculty
Ohio State University faculty
Regenerative biomedicine
Lawrence Berkeley National Laboratory people
University of Eastern Finland alumni
Year of birth missing (living people)
Living people